Pavel Markovich Dyakonov (born 16 March 1973) is a former Russian professional footballer.

Club career
He made his debut in the Russian Premier League in 2005 for FC Tom Tomsk.

References

1973 births
Footballers from Saint Petersburg
Living people
Russian footballers
Association football goalkeepers
FC Elista players
FC Tom Tomsk players
FC Fakel Voronezh players
Russian Premier League players
FC Arsenal Tula players
FC Zvezda Irkutsk players
FC Sakhalin Yuzhno-Sakhalinsk players
FC Dynamo Saint Petersburg players
FC Lokomotiv Saint Petersburg players
FC Chita players